The 1909 Forfarshire by-election was held on 27 February 1909.  The by-election was held due to the elevation to the peerage of the incumbent Liberal MP, John Sinclair who became Baron Pentland.  It was won by the Liberal candidate James Falconer.

References

Forfarshire by-election
1900s elections in Scotland
Politics of Angus, Scotland
Forfarshire by-election
By-elections to the Parliament of the United Kingdom in Scottish constituencies
Forfarshire by-election